Pieza is a genus of flies in the family Mythicomyiidae. Its species are found in North America, South America, and the West Indies. The genus was named by Neal Evenhuis in 2002. Evenhuis included the following eleven species, transferring four from Mythicomyia, in his initial circumscription:

 P. agnastis  — Chile (Maule, Santiago)
 P. angusta  — United States (California, Arizona, New Mexico, Texas) and Mexico (Baja California, Jalisco, Sonora, Tamaulipas)
 P. deresistans  — northern Venezuela
 P. dominicana  — Dominican amber, Miocene
 P. flavitibia  — northern Venezuela
 P. kake  — Brazil (Minas Gerais)
 P. minuta  — United States (Arizona, California, New Mexico) and Mexico (Baja California Sur, Sonora)
 P. ostenta  — United States (Arizona, California, Colorado, Texas, Utah) and Mexico (Baja California Sur, Sonora)
 P. pi  — Bahamas, Turks and Caicos, Mexico (Morelos)
 P. rhea  — United States (Florida)
 P. sinclairi  — Curaçao, Dominican Republic; introduced to Galápagos Islands

, Pieza still consists of these eleven species.

References

Works cited

 
 
 

Asiloidea genera
Mythicomyiidae